IBE or Ibe may refer to:

Chidiebere Ibe, Nigerian medical illustrator and student
, Belgian singer; see The Voice van Vlaanderen
Identity-based encryption
Inference to the Best Explanation
Intercultural bilingual education
Internet Booking Engine
Ion beam etching
Institute of Biological Engineering
Institute of Business Ethics
International Breakdance Event, the "Notorious IBE" festival held annually in the Netherlands
International Bureau of Education, a UNESCO institute
Jordon Ibe, English footballer who plays for Derby County as a winger